Robin Sibson (4 May 1944 – 19 March 2017) was a British mathematician and educator.

He was a fellow of King's College, Cambridge, professor of statistics at the University of Bath and then vice-chancellor of the University of Kent.  He was chief executive of the Higher Education Statistics Agency from 2001 until 2009. He was also a member of the Committee for Higher Education and Research (CC-HER), the predecessor to the Steering Committee for Higher Education and Research (CDESR).

He died on 19 March 2017 at the age of 72.

Research 
He was the developer of natural neighbour interpolation on discrete sets of points in space.

Selected bibliography

Books

Chapter in books

References

External links 
 
 Professor Robin Sibson appointed as new Chief Executive of HESA

1944 births
2017 deaths
20th-century British mathematicians
21st-century British mathematicians
Fellows of King's College, Cambridge
Academics of the University of Bath
Vice-Chancellors of the University of Kent
Alumni of King's College, Cambridge